Pedda Kotha Pally is a Mandal in Nagarkurnool district, Telangana.

Villages
The villages in Peddakothapally mandal include:
 Permandlapally
 Mustipally
 Marikal 
 Chandrakal 	
 Sanjeevapoor 
 Chennapuraopally 	
 Chinna karupamula 	
 Chinna kothapally 	
 Devalthirumalapur 	
 Gantraopally 	
 Jonnalaboguda 	
 Kalwakole
 Maredudinne 		
 Narayanapally 	
 Peddakarpamula 	
 Peddakothapally 	
 Sathapur 	
 Vennacharla
 Yapatla

References

Mandals in Nagarkurnool district